Banshlai Bridge railway station is a small halt station that is located on the banks of Bansloi River in Birbhum district, West Bengal.

References

Railway stations in Birbhum district
Howrah railway division